The 1959 All-Ireland Senior Camogie Championship Final was the 28th All-Ireland Final and the deciding match of the 1959 All-Ireland Senior Camogie Championship, an inter-county camogie tournament for the top teams in Ireland.

Mayo, playing in their first (and, as of 2011, only) All-Ireland final, were well off the pace, and only managed one point in the first half. Dublin won by thirty-three points, still the record for an All-Ireland camogie final.

References

All-Ireland Senior Camogie Championship Final
All-Ireland Senior Camogie Championship Final
All-Ireland Senior Camogie Championship Final, 1959
All-Ireland Senior Camogie Championship Finals
Dublin county camogie team matches